Sandra Church (born January 13, 1937) is an American actress and singer. She is best known for her performance as the original Gypsy Rose Lee in Gypsy (1959), for which she was nominated for a Tony Award for Best Featured Actress in a Musical. She also co-starred with Marlon Brando in The Ugly American (1963).

Early life
Church was born and raised in San Francisco, California. Her father died when she was two years old in a car accident. Her mother, a registered nurse with theatrical ambitions herself, moved Church at the age of five to Hollywood to pursue a career in acting. She attended Immaculate Heart High School.

She was taken out of high school to audition for the lead role in Picnic, which kicked off her acting career.

Career

Theatre
From 1953 to 1959, Church played various ingénue roles in theatrical plays. In 1953, Church made her Broadway debut in the role of Madge Owens, replacing Janice Rule, in William Inge's Picnic with Ralph Meeker. Her next performance was playing Sonya in Uncle Vanya (1956), an off-broadway production with Franchot Tone and Signe Hasso, followed by a role as Betsy Dean in the Ronald Alexander play Holiday for Lovers (1957). Church was featured as Helen White in Sherwood Anderson's Winesburg, Ohio alongside Dorothy McGuire and James Whitmore.

Church's breakout performance came in 1959 as the original Gypsy Rose Lee in Gypsy (1959), for which she was nominated for a Tony Award for Best Featured Actress in a Musical. In his autobiography, playwright Arthur Laurents states, "It came down to between Suzanne Pleshette and Sandra Church. Suzanne was the better actress, but Sandra was the better singer. We went with Sandra." In Gypsy, Church introduced the popular standard "Let Me Entertain You."

Following Gypsy, Church appeared in the 1960 Broadway play Under the Yum Yum Tree, directed by Joseph Anthony.

Films and television
Church's first on-screen appearance was on the Producers' Showcase, followed by the role of Jeannie in The Mugger (1958). She subsequently guest starred on the television series Look Up And Live (1959), as well as The DuPont Show of the Month in 1960. Three years later, she played Marion MacWhite in the film adaptation of Eugene Burdick and William Lederer's novel, The Ugly American (1963). Also in 1963, she appeared on television in The Eleventh Hour and Kraft Suspense Theatre.

Discography

Personal life
In October 1961 it was widely reported that Church and Gypsy composer Jule Styne would marry, although this was untrue. In November 1964, she married Broadway play producer Norman Twain in Bridgetown, Barbados at the home of stage designer Oliver Messel. The couple divorced in 1975. She later married Albert H. Clayburgh until his passing in 1997.

Church's great-aunt was educator Mary Florence Denton, a longtime faculty member at Doshisha University in Kyoto.

References

External links

1938 births
American women singers
American film actresses
Actresses from San Francisco
Grammy Award winners
Grammy Hall of Fame Award recipients
Living people
Singers from San Francisco
21st-century American women